Vicky Hamilton (died 1971) was an American jazz singer-songwriter-composer. She worked with American jazz pianist, singer-composer, Dave MacKay whom she was also married to. In the late-1960s Mackay and Vicky Hamilton formed a duo and produced three recordings together. Hamilton died in 1971.

Discography
Dave Mackay with Vicky Hamilton, Hands (Andy Simpkins, Joey Baron, Ira Schulman, Chuck Domanico, Joe Porcaro, Ray Neapolitan, Discovery, 1983, Recorded in 1969 & 1983)
Dave Mackay & Vicky Hamilton, Rainbows (Joe Pass, Ira Schulman, Chuck Domanico, Colin Bailey, Impulse, 1970)
Dave Mackay & Vicky Hamilton, Self Titled (Ira Schulman, Ray Neapolitan, Joe Porcaro, Francisco Aguabella, Impulse, 1969)

Reception
New York Times critic Rex Reed wrote in 1969 of their self-titled album:

Reed also considered, "There isn't one band on this disk that could be considered less than perfect. ... Their up tunes are filled with joy and sass, and their ballads are lush and hypnotic. .... Miss Hamilton sings like a dream".

Other reviewers were also positive. One said, "a very good blending of voices ... always [] gentle, never too loud. ... a very tasteful album - quite surprising in fact." Another also commented, "The mellow voices of Dave and Vicky blend beautifully with the jazz sounds for some unusual effects", while a third found them "fresh and stimulting [sic] in the tradition of Jackie and Roy ... experts at injecting unusual meters into their approach, giving their original compositions an off-beat style."

References

External links

 Vicky Hamilton on Discogs

Year of birth missing
1971 deaths
American women jazz musicians
American women singer-songwriters
American women composers